The Yesvantpur–Karwar Express is an Express train belonging to South Western Railway zone that runs between  and  in India. It is currently being operated with 16515/16516 train numbers on tri-weekly basis.

Service

The 16515/Yesvantpur–Karwar Express has an average speed of 39 km/hr and covers 610 km in 15h 30m. The 16516/Karwar–Yesvantpur Express has an average speed of 41 km/hr and covers 610 km in 15h.

Route and halts 

The important halts of the train are:

 
 
 Nelamangala

Coach composition

The train has standard LHB rakes with a max speed of 160 kmph. The train consists of 14 coaches:

 1 AC Chair Car
 7 Second Sitting
 2 General Unreserved
 2 EOG rake
 2 Vistadome Coaches

Traction

Both trains are hauled by a Krishnarajapuram Loco Shed-based WDM-3A diesel locomotive from Yesvantpur to Mangaluru Junctio and hauled by Arakkonam Loco Shed-based WAP-4 electric locomotive.

Direction reversal

The train reverses its direction 1 times:

Schedule 

16515/16 – runs daily from both directions

See also 

 Karwar railway station
 Yesvantpur Junction railway station
 Yesvantpur–Vasco da Gama Express

References

External links 

 16515/Yesvantpur - Karwar Express India Rail Info
 16516/Karwar - Yesvantpur Express India Rail Info

Transport in Karwar
Transport in Bangalore
Express trains in India
Rail transport in Karnataka
Railway services introduced in 2009